Jan Ziemianin (born 19 May 1962) is a Polish biathlete. He competed at the 1992 Winter Olympics, the 1994 Winter Olympics and the 1998 Winter Olympics.

References

1962 births
Living people
Polish male biathletes
Olympic biathletes of Poland
Biathletes at the 1992 Winter Olympics
Biathletes at the 1994 Winter Olympics
Biathletes at the 1998 Winter Olympics
People from Limanowa County